Abdul Thompson Conteh (born July 2, 1970 in Freetown) is a former Sierra Leonean football striker.

Conteh played three seasons in Major League Soccer, with San Jose Earthquakes in 2000 and D.C. United in 2001 and 2002. He scored a total 15 goals in league play. Conteh also played in Mexico (Toluca and Monterrey), El Salvador (Atlético Marte) and Guatemala (Comunicaciones), as well as the Pittsburgh Riverhounds of the USL A-League. He used number 690 in his shirt when he played with Monterrey in 1998.

In 2000, Conteh was named MLS Humanitarian of the Year for his work with the American Red Cross to "raise funds to try to allieve the suffering in Sierra Leone".

References

External links

Profile at MedioTiempo.com 

1970 births
Living people
Sportspeople from Freetown
Sierra Leonean footballers
Sierra Leone international footballers
1994 African Cup of Nations players
Sierra Leonean expatriate footballers
Expatriate footballers in Guyana
C.D. Atlético Marte footballers
Expatriate footballers in El Salvador
Expatriate footballers in Mexico
Liga MX players
Deportivo Toluca F.C. players
C.F. Monterrey players
Expatriate footballers in Guatemala
Comunicaciones F.C. players
F.C. Motagua players
Expatriate soccer players in the United States
Major League Soccer players
San Jose Earthquakes players
Sierra Leonean emigrants to the United States
D.C. United players
USL First Division players
Pittsburgh Riverhounds SC players
Sierra Leonean expatriate sportspeople in El Salvador
Sierra Leonean expatriate sportspeople in Guatemala
Sierra Leonean expatriate sportspeople in Guyana
Sierra Leonean expatriate sportspeople in Mexico
Sierra Leonean expatriate sportspeople in the United States
Association football forwards